Awami Front (Popular Front), was a front of six Muslim political parties in Uttar Pradesh, India. AF was formed ahead of the 2002 state assembly elections.

The initiative of formation the front was taken by Indian Muslim Political Conference (which would later form the Parcham Party of India). The five other constituents were Indian National League, National Loktantrik Party, All India Muslim Forum, Muslim Majlis and Momin Conference.

Alhaj Sheikh, the president of Momin Conference, was elected chairman of AF.

NLP and Muslim Majlis later disengaged from the front, and by the time of the 2004 Lok Sabha elections it was largely defunct.

Defunct political parties in Uttar Pradesh
2002 establishments in Uttar Pradesh
Political parties established in 2002